The Lee County Courthouse is a historic two-story brick county courthouse in Opelika, Alabama, county seat of Lee County, Alabama. It was constructed in 1896 and was added to the National Register of Historic Places in 1973. It was designed by  Atlanta architect Andrew J. Bryan and Company and was built by Andrews & Stevens. The building's design is Neoclassical architecture.

The courthouse building and a separate jail building were built for $35,000.  The courthouse replaced a previous courthouse, also a two-story brick building, which was demolished after the new structure was finished.

See also
List of county courthouses in Alabama

References

County courthouses in Alabama
Courthouses on the National Register of Historic Places in Alabama
National Register of Historic Places in Lee County, Alabama
Government buildings completed in 1896
Neoclassical architecture in Alabama